Pecice may refer to:

 Czech Republic
 Pečice (Příbram District), Central Bohemian Region
 Pěčice, Mladá Boleslav District, Central Bohemian Region

 Poland
 Pęcice, Gmina Michałowice, Masovian Voivodeship

 Slovenia
 Pečice, Brežice
 Pečice, Litija